Association Sportive Mangasport, abbreviated AS Mangasport, is a Gabonese football club based in Moanda. It was founded in 1962. They play at the Stade Henri Sylvoz.

Achievements

Gabon Championnat National D1: 9
 1995, 2000, 2004, 2005, 2006, 2008, 2014, 2015, 2018.

Coupe du Gabon Interclubs: 6
 1964, 1994, 2001, 2005, 2007, 2011.

Super Coupe du Gabon: 3
 1994, 2001, 2006.

Performance in CAF competitions
CAF Champions League: 5 appearances
2001 – Preliminary Round
2005 – Preliminary Round
2006 – Preliminary Round
2007 – First Round
2009 – First Round

African Cup of Champions Clubs: 1 appearance
1996 – First Round

CAF Confederation Cup: 1 appearance
2012 –

CAF Cup: 1 appearance
1997 – First Round

CAF Cup Winners' Cup: 2 appearances
1995 – First Round
2002 – Second Round

Current squad

External links 
  Official website

Football clubs in Gabon
Association football clubs established in 1962
1962 establishments in Gabon